Pood (plural:  or ) is a unit of mass equal to 40 funt (Russian pound). Since 1899 it is set to approximately 16.38 kilograms (36.11 pounds). It was used in Russia, Belarus, and Ukraine. Pood was first mentioned in a number of 12th-century documents.

Use in the past and present 

Together with other units of weight of the Imperial Russian weight measurement system, the USSR officially abolished the pood in 1924. But the term remained in widespread use at least until the 1940s.  In his 1953 short story "Matryona's Place", Aleksandr Solzhenitsyn presents the pood as still in use amongst the Khrushchev-era Soviet peasants.

Its usage is preserved in modern Russian in certain specific cases, e.g., in reference to sports weights, such as traditional Russian kettlebells, cast in multiples and fractions of 16 kg (which is pood rounded to metric units). For example, a 24 kg kettlebell is commonly referred to as "one-and-half pood kettlebell". It is also sometimes used when reporting the amounts of bulk agricultural production, such as grains or potatoes.

An old Russian proverb reads, "You know a man when you have eaten a pood of salt with him."

Idioms in Slavic languages 
In modern colloquial Russian, the expression  – 'a hundred poods,' an intentional play on the foreign "hundred percent" – imparts the ponderative sense of overwhelming weight to the declarative sentence it is added to. The generic meaning of "very serious" or "absolutely sure" has almost supplanted its original meaning of "very heavy weight." The adjective  and the adverb  are also used to convey the same sense of certainty.

The word is also used in Polish idiomatically or as a proverb (with the original/strict meaning commonly forgotten):  (Polish for 'unsupportable boredoms', literally 'boredoms [that could be measured] in poods')

References

External links
Conversion factors from pood to other units of mass (contemporary and ancient)

Obsolete units of measurement
Units of mass